Olga Jegunova (born 25 May 1984) is a Latvian classical pianist, born in Šiauliai, Lithuania (then Lithuanian Soviet Socialist Republic), and now living in London.

Career 
After studying music at Jāzeps Vītols Latvian Academy of Music, concluding with a bachelor's degree, she obtained her master's degree at the Hochschule für Musik und Theater Hamburg. This was followed by studying at the Royal College of Music (Artist Diploma course as an RCM scholar under Dmitri Alexeev) and then at the Royal Northern College of Music where her piano teacher was Norma Fisher. In 2013 she studied at the Samling Academy in the UK.

Jegunova has taken part in numerous master classes with eminent pianists such as András Schiff at the Prussian Cove International Musicians Seminar, an annual event, Ferenc Rados, Eliso Virsaladze, Mikhail Voskresensky, Benjamin Zander and Lazar Berman. As a soloist she has worked with conductors such as Saulius Sondeckis, Alexander Soddy, Andres Mustonen and Muhai Tang and appeared with ensembles and orchestras such as the Sinfonia Concertante, founded by musicians of the Deutsche Kammerphilharmonie Bremen, the Lithuanian Chamber Orchestra, the Zurich Chamber Orchestra, the Pasdeloup Orchestra and the Manchester Camerata.

In 2013, Jegunova gave a recital at the Edinburgh International Festival which was met with enthusiastic critical acclaim, played the same year in the "Noureev & Friends" concert performance in the Palais des congrès in Paris, and in 2015 for the Latvian EU Presidency's annual Burns supper in Brussels.

In 2014 she played before Princess Beatrix of the Netherlands, in 2015 at the Latvian Day Celebration Concert in the Westminster Cathedral Hall in the presence of the Latvian ambassador, Andris Teikmanis, and was chosen to take part in the Baltic Stars Ensemble, a concert organised by the City Music Society of London in the St Lawrence Jewry Church.

On 2 December 2015 Jegunova launched a charity called OlgaRhythm which aims to support talented music students of any age and ability.

Collaborations 
Jegunova has worked with Alina García-Lapuerta and re-created, with the soprano Kirstin Sharpin, the "Lost Song" originally sung by Maria de las Mercedes Santa Cruz y Montalvo. She has also worked with the story teller Jan Blake on the Peter and the Wolf performance for children.

Jegunova was invited to work as a presenter at the 2015 International Tchaikovsky Competition in Moscow, where she interviewed Vadim Repin, violinist and member of the jury, and Maxim Vengerov. She also broadcast live interviews with other well-known musicians at this competition.

Since 2009, Jegunova has worked as a performer for Live Music Now, a charity providing live music in the concert hall as well as in the welfare, educational, justice and health sectors. She teaches piano to students of Queen Mary University of London.

Awards 
Jegunova won the Concours Musical de France Ginette Gaubert in Paris and in 2008 the Steinway-Förderpreis in Hamburg. In 2016 she was accepted by Steinway & Sons as a Steinway Artist. She has been a prize-winner at the Concours International de Piano Maryse Cheilan in France, at the Stasys Vainiūnas competition in Vilnius and at the competition of the foundation Animato in Zurich, and was a semi-finalist at the prestigious Concours Géza Anda in Zurich.

References

External links 
 Official website
 Olga Jegunova BBC Arabic interview

Latvian classical pianists
Women classical pianists
Living people
Latvian expatriates in the United Kingdom
Alumni of the Royal College of Music
Alumni of the Royal Northern College of Music
21st-century classical pianists
1984 births